The Strange Awakening is a 1958 British film directed by Montgomery Tully and starring Lex Barker. It was released in the United States as Female Fiends.

Cast
Lex Barker as Peter Chance
Carole Mathews as Selena Friend
Lisa Gastoni as Marny Friend
Nora Swinburne as Mrs. Friend
Peter Dyneley as Dr. Rene Normand
Joe Robinson as Sven
Malou Pantera as Isabella
Richard Molinas as Louis
John Serret as Commissaire Sagain
Stanley Maxted as Mr. Moffat
Monica Grey as Iris Chance
Yvonne Andre as Nun
Raf De La Torre as Mr. Petheridge

References

External links

1958 films
Films directed by Montgomery Tully
Films about amnesia
British thriller drama films
1950s English-language films
1950s British films